The Battle of Tian Shan was a battle fought in Tian Shan (in modern-day Xinjiang) in 99 BC during the Han–Xiongnu War. The battle ended with the defeat of the Han Dynasty, whose forces were led by Li Guangli.

Prelude 
Both Xiongnu and Han forces suffered considerable losses in the Battle of Mobei, after which the fighting ceased temporarily. After a period of recovery, Xiongnu began to invade the borders of the Han Dynasty again. Finally, Emperor Liu Che ordered Li Guangli to lead an attack on Xiongnu.

The battle 
In 99 BC, Li Guangli led 30 thousand cavalrymen in an attack on the Xiongnu forces in Tian Shan. The attack was successful, with enemy losses totaling over 10 thousand. However, as the Han army withdrew, it became surrounded by enemy forces, and many soldiers died of starvation. Eventually, Li escaped with the help of Zhao Chongguo, but almost 60 percent of the soldiers had lost their lives by this time. Li Ling, leading 5 thousand cavalrymen, was also attacked by Xiongnu. He eventually surrendered.

References 

99 BC
Tian Shan 99 BC
Tian Shan 99 BC
1st century BC in China
History of Xinjiang
Tian Shan